Glynrich is the site for two historic homes: the Richard Richardson House and the Brick Mill House. They are located at Wilmington, New Castle County, Delaware. The Brick Mill House, also known as the John Richardson House, was built about 1723, and is a two-story, three-bay, gable roof brick structure with Flemish bond and glazed headers on the facade rising from a full raised basement. It has a one-bay, hipped roof, wooden entrance porch. The Richard Richardson House was built in 1765, and is a two-story five-bay, center-hall, double pile with a lower single pile two-story wing at the east end. It is in the Georgian style.  It has a five-bay, hipped roof Georgian Revival porch added around 1900.  The property was the site of extensive milling activities on the Mill Creek in the 18th and 19th centuries.

It was added to the National Register of Historic Places in 1979.

References

External links

Historic American Buildings Survey in Delaware
Houses on the National Register of Historic Places in Delaware
Georgian architecture in Delaware
Houses completed in 1723
Houses completed in 1765
Houses in Wilmington, Delaware
National Register of Historic Places in Wilmington, Delaware
1723 establishments in the Thirteen Colonies